The "presumption of legitimacy" is a common law rule of evidence that states that a child born within the subsistence of a marriage is presumed to be the child of the husband.

Early history
Paternity is considered an important issue in determining the rules of succession. Illegitimate children were originally excluded from royal succession, hereditary titles, and property.

See also
Mater semper certa est

References

Family law